Her Father's Son is a 1916 American silent comedy film directed by William Desmond Taylor and written by Anna Fielder Brand and L. V. Jefferson. The film stars Vivian Martin, Gayne Whitman, Herbert Standing, Helen Jerome Eddy, Joe Massey, and Jack Lawton. The film was released on October 12, 1916, by Paramount Pictures.

Plot
When Frances Fletcher (Martin), a Southern young woman, moves in with her uncle William (Standing) just before the start of the Civil War, she dresses as a young man in order to secure her inheritance. Problems arise after the war breaks out and her uncle takes in Lt. Richard Harkness (Whitman) as his guest and the Union officer expresses a fondness in the cross-dressed Frances.

Cast
Vivian Martin as Frances Fletcher
Gayne Whitman as Lt. Richard Harkness 
Herbert Standing as William Fletcher
Helen Jerome Eddy as Betty Fletcher
Joe Massey as John Fletcher
Jack Lawton as Willard Gordon
Lucille Ward as Mammy Chloe
Tom Bates as Mose

Preservation status
 Her Father's Son is preserved in the Library of Congress collection.

References

External links

1916 films
1910s English-language films
Silent American comedy films
1916 comedy films
Paramount Pictures films
Films directed by William Desmond Taylor
American Civil War films
American black-and-white films
American silent feature films
1910s American films